A screwball is a type of frozen confection that first appeared in the 1970s. It consists of ice cream inside a conical, plastic cup with a gumball at the bottom; the flavor of the ice cream is usually raspberry ripple. Several prominent brands produce screwballs, for example Asda, Popsicle, and Eskimo Pie. The name was originally a commercial product name but is now used to describe all such ice cream treats, whoever makes them. The product does not qualify as ice cream under USDA guidelines.

'Two Ball Screwball' is a brand name (in the United States, a registered trademark) for a screwball containing two gumballs. The original flavor was cherry but other flavors have been introduced such as a mix of lemon and blue raspberry. As with all screwballs, the shape is that of a cone with the gumballs at the bottom.

References 

Ice cream